Deirdre Duke (born 9 June 1992) is an Ireland women's field hockey international. She was a member of the Ireland team that played in 2018 Women's Hockey World Cup final. Duke has also won Irish Senior Cup and Women's Irish Hockey League titles with UCD. She has also captained the UCD team. Duke also won an All-Ireland Under-14 Ladies' Football Championship with Dublin and represented the Republic of Ireland women's national under-17 football team.

Early years and education 
Duke is the daughter of Gretta Duke, née Carroll, who is originally from Ballycanew, County Wexford. She was educated at Alexandra College, Northeastern University and University College Dublin. Duke graduated from the UCD Sutherland School of Law in September 2017 with a BCL with Social Justice degree. In addition to playing women's field hockey, Duke also played both Ladies' Gaelic football and women's association football in her youth. She played Gaelic football for Kilmacud Crokes and was also a member the Dublin team that won the 2005 All-Ireland Under-14 Ladies' Football Championship, defeating Donegal 5–8 to 4–7 in the final. Duke also played association football for Alexandra College, where her teammates included Emily Beatty, and represented the Republic of Ireland women's national football team at schoolgirl level. Her international teammates included Ciara Grant, Naomi Carroll and Dora Gorman.

Clubs

Early years
Duke played field hockey with Alexandra College. In 2011, along with Emily Beatty, she was a member of the Alexandra College team that won the Leinster Schoolgirls' Senior Cup. In the final they defeated a St. Andrew's College team that included Gillian Pinder. Duke also played for both Three Rock Rovers and Hermes.

UCD
Duke started playing for UCD in 2011–12. On 13 May 2012, together with Dora Gorman, Chloe Watkins and Anna O'Flanagan, Duke was a member of the UCD team that won the Irish Senior Cup, defeating Loreto 3–2 in the final. Duke was also in the squad when UCD won the Irish Senior Cup in 2014.  In 2013–14, together with Katie Mullan, Gillian Pinder, Nicola Evans, Anna O'Flanagan and Emily Beatty, Duke was a member of the UCD team that won their first Women's Irish Hockey League title. On 2 April 2017 Duke scored the winner in the 2017 Irish Senior Cup final as UCD defeated Cork Harlequins in the final. She was also captain of the UCD team. She  captained the UCD team again when they defeated Pegasus 4–0 to retain the cup in 2018. Duke also captained UCD to further Irish Hockey League titles in 2016–17 and 2017–18. In 2017 UCD completed a treble when they also won the EY Champions Trophy after defeating Hermes-Monkstown in a penalty shoot-out. Duke also helped UCD win five Chilean Cup titles  and played for UCD in the 2015 and 2018 EuroHockey Club Champions Cups.

Northeastern Huskies
The 2012–13 season saw Duke attend Northeastern University, where she played for Northeastern Huskies. While in Boston, Duke was watching the 2013 marathon when the event was interrupted by a terrorist attack. She was standing close to the spot where the second bomb went off but had left the area just half an hour before the explosions.

Düsseldorfer Hockey Club
Following her performance with Ireland at the 2018 Women's Hockey World Cup, Duke announced she would be joining  Düsseldorfer Hockey Club for the 2018–19 season.

Ireland international
Duke represented Ireland at Under-16, Under-18 and Under-21 levels  before making her senior debut against Scotland in June 2013. Duke was a member of the Ireland team that won the 2015 Women's EuroHockey Championship II, defeating the Czech Republic 5–0 in the final.

Duke also represented Ireland at the 2018 Women's Hockey World Cup and was a prominent member of the team that won the silver medal. On 21 July 2018 she scored twice against the United States as Ireland won their opening pool stage game 3–1. She also featured in further pool games against India and England, in the quarter-final against India, in the semi-final against Spain and in the final against the Netherlands.

Occupation
Together with Lizzie Colvin, Nicola Evans, Anna O'Flanagan and Gillian Pinder,  Duke was one of five lawyers in the Ireland squad at the 2018 Women's Hockey World Cup. Duke is a trainee solicitor with A&L Goodbody.

Honours

Field hockey 
Ireland
Women's Hockey World Cup
Runners Up: 2018
Women's EuroHockey Championship II
Winners: 2015
Women's FIH Hockey Series
Runners Up: 2019 Banbridge
UCD
Women's Irish Hockey League
Winners: 2013–14, 2016–17, 2017–18
Irish Senior Cup
Winners: 2011–12, 2013–14, 2016–17, 2017–18
EY Champions Trophy
Winners: 2017
Chilean Cup
Winners: 2011, 2013, 2015, 2016, 2017
Alexandra College
Leinster Schoolgirls' Senior Cup
Winners: 2011

Gaelic football 
Dublin
All-Ireland Under-14 Ladies' Football Championship
Winners: 2005

References

External links
 
 Deirdre Duke at Hockey Ireland

1992 births
Living people
Irish female field hockey players
Place of birth missing (living people)
People educated at Alexandra College
Northeastern Huskies field hockey players
Alumni of University College Dublin
Dublin ladies' Gaelic footballers
Kilmacud Crokes Gaelic footballers
Republic of Ireland women's association footballers
Field hockey players from County Dublin
Association footballers from County Dublin
Female field hockey forwards
Ireland international women's field hockey players
UCD Ladies' Hockey Club players
Women's association footballers not categorized by position
Irish women lawyers
21st-century Irish lawyers
Women's Irish Hockey League players
Three Rock Rovers Hockey Club players
Irish expatriate sportspeople in Germany
Feldhockey Bundesliga (Women's field hockey) players
Ladies' Gaelic footballers who switched code
21st-century women lawyers
Field hockey players at the 2020 Summer Olympics
Olympic field hockey players of Ireland
Republic of Ireland women's youth international footballers